"If I Die Young" is a song written by Kimberly Perry, and recorded by American country music trio the Band Perry. It was released on June 8, 2010, as the second single from the group's self-titled debut album.

Content 
"If I Die Young" is a mid-tempo tune accompanied by acoustic guitar, banjo, accordion, mandolin, fiddle, electric bass, and drums. It is in the key of E Major. The song is about the sadness of dying young ("The sharp knife of a short life") as the narrator describes how she never really got to experience love and worrying about how her loved ones will miss her and deal with the loss. She recognizes that once someone passes away, others seem to pay more attention to that person's life: "And maybe then you'll hear the words I been singin' / Funny when you're dead how people start listenin'." She states that if she dies young, then her family left behind should "save their tears" for a time when "they're really gonna need them." She states that she has had a well-lived life in the line "Well, I've had just enough time."

Reception 
The Band Perry received at least one letter in response to the song. In its envelope, the members also found a necklace with a ring on it. The letter's author was a young girl who had recently lost her best friend to cancer. Mourning her friend's death, the girl was contemplating suicide. Driving from work one day, she heard "If I Die Young" on the radio. Hearing "so much life in the song", the girl changed her mind. In her letter to The Band Perry, she wrote about the necklace: "I'm sending this to you, because it's the most important thing I own. This song literally saved my life."

Critical 
Bobby Peacock of Roughstock spoke positively of the lyrics, saying that they were "very well-developed with interesting little details." He felt that, although the topic is "a little sugarcoated", the vocal performance is a "pleasant listening experience".

Commercial 
"If I Die Young" debuted at number 57 on the U.S. Billboard Hot Country Songs chart for the week of May 29, 2010. It also debuted at number 92 on the Billboard Hot 100 chart for the week of July 24, 2010. In October 2010, it became the group's first top 10 single on the Hot Country Songs chart as well as their first top 20 on the Hot 100 chart. The song became their first number one hit on the Hot Country Songs chart for the week of December 11, 2010.

In early 2011, the song was remixed by Matt Ward and Dean Gillard for pop radio. The remix debuted at number 36 on the U.S. Billboard Pop Songs chart and number 29 on the U.S. Billboard Adult Contemporary chart for the week of June 11, 2011. With the remix impacting pop radio, the song re-entered the Hot 100 chart at number 46 for the week of June 25, 2011. It has since reached a new peak of number 14.

In May 2011, the song sold over 2 million copies, the eleventh country music song to do so, and only the fourth time that a band reached this plateau, following Lady A, Zac Brown Band and Rascal Flatts. At the time, "If I Die Young" song was the highest-selling single to miss the top ten, and as of August 24, 2015, "If I Die Young" surpassed 5 million downloads.

In July 2011, the song reached the top 15 of the Billboard Hot 100 chart in its thirty-fifth chart week, making it the slowest climb into the top 15. It broke the slowest climb record that was previously held by Carrie Underwood's "Before He Cheats", and Taylor Swift's "Teardrops on My Guitar". Both songs took thirty-three weeks to reach the top 15. The song spent 53 weeks on Billboard Hot 100 chart and is their best-selling single to date. It is also the only song with 53 or more weeks that ended its chart run in 2011.

Music video 
The music video, which was directed by David McClister, premiered on CMT on May 27, 2010. In the video, the band is shown setting Kimberly Perry in a canoe before pushing it off into the river. Perry is holding a book containing poems by Tennyson, including "The Lady of Shalott", which the book is opened to at the end of the music video. The video echoes a scene in Anne of Green Gables in which Anne attempts to appear as the Lady of the poem. Kimberly's mother and her love interest (played by Kyle Kupecky) are shown plucking flower petals and visibly depressed that she has left them. Eventually, her canoe begins to take on water, she sits up. Once this occurs her brothers come back for her. When she gets back to her house, her mother and love interest embrace her.  The video was filmed on location at Two Rivers Mansion outside of Nashville, Tennessee. Throughout the video, the band is also shown performing with their instruments inside of the house.

Charts

Weekly charts

Year-end charts

Certifications

Awards and nominations

Release history

Glee version 

In 2013, Naya Rivera performed the song as her character Santana Lopez in tribute episode "The Quarterback", during the fifth season of the Fox comedy-drama series Glee, in honor of co-star and close friend Cory Monteith, who died on July 13, 2013. Monteith played Finn Hudson on the show, with his character also dying.

In a scene in the episode, Santana talks about Finn before beginning an acoustic cover of the song, but she breaks down in tears of sadness and grief over Finn before she can finish and runs away when friends try to console her. Speaking about the usage before the episode was broadcast, Kimberly Perry said: "I'm so excited that song is being used that way because even though it has 'die' in the title, it was really inspired by and about celebrating life [...] I obviously haven't seen the episode that's a tribute to Cory, but I feel like they're going to focus on his life rather than his death, so I'm really excited that 'If I Die Young' is going to be part of honoring him". Jeff Jensen for Entertainment Weekly confirmed that the episode focused on life, not death, and described Rivera's performance of the song as "the number of the night" and that it "was memorable for how she broke down halfway through it, then unleashed a furious howl".

The cover was released as a single as well as being a track on the album Glee: The Quarterback. The album debuted at number 7 on the Billboard 200, selling 47,000 copies and also charted as number one on the Billboard Soundtracks. The song was the last Glee single to chart during the show's run, doing so in the UK and Ireland.

Following Rivera's disappearance and death in July 2020, which was confirmed on July 13, 2020, the 7-year anniversary of Monteith's death, the song saw a surge of views on YouTube and became a trending topic on Twitter; some fans thought this was an insensitive reaction however, and that other songs performed by Rivera would be better to promote.

Cady Groves cover 
In February 2012, American pop-country singer Cady Groves uploaded a live cover of the song to SoundCloud. Prophetically, Groves would die in 2020 at the age of 30 from complications caused by alcohol abuse.

See also 
 List of number-one country singles of 2010 (U.S.)
 List of Billboard Adult Contemporary number ones of 2011

References 

2010s ballads
2010 singles
2010 songs
The Band Perry songs
Country ballads
Song recordings produced by Paul Worley
Song recordings produced by Nathan Chapman (record producer)
Republic Records singles
Republic Nashville singles
Pop ballads
Songs about death